Westmorland was a constituency covering the county of Westmorland in the North of England, which returned Members of Parliament to the House of Commons of the Parliament of the United Kingdom.

The constituency had two separate periods of existence.

Until 1885
It returned two Members of Parliament (MPs) to the House of Commons of the Parliament of the United Kingdom. For the string of elections from 1885 general election it split in two: Appleby and Kendal, both of which had been parliamentary boroughs but were reconstituted as county constituencies.

1918–1983
The constituency was recreated as a single-seater for the 1918 general election and abolished for the 1983 general election.

In the boundary changes in 1983 the southern part of the constituency became part of the new seat of Westmorland and Lonsdale and the northern area was transferred to Penrith and The Border

Boundaries
The 1918 – 1983 seat corresponded to the county of Westmorland even after the abolition of the administrative county in 1974.

Members of Parliament
 Constituency created (1290)

MPs 1290–1640

MPs 1640–1885

Notes

MPs 1918–1983

Election results 1290–1885

Election results taken from the History of Parliament Trust series.

Elections in the 18th century

Lowther appointed a Commissioner of the Revenue in Ireland

Elections in the 1830s

Elections in the 1840s

William Lowther was appointed Postmaster General of the United Kingdom and called to the House of Lords as Baron Lowther, causing a by-election.

Elections in the 1850s

Thompson's death caused a by-election.

Elections in the 1860s

Lowther's death caused a by-election.

Elections in the 1870s
Taylour succeeded to the peerage, becoming Marquess of Headfort and causing a by-election at which his son was elected unopposed.

Elections in the 1880s

Election results 1918–1983

Elections in the 1910s

Elections in the 1920s

Elections in the 1930s

General Election 1939/40

Another General Election was required to take place before the end of 1940. The political parties had been making preparations for an election to take place from 1939 and by the end of this year, the following candidates had been selected; 
Conservative: Oliver Stanley
Labour: R S Armstrong
Liberal: Geoffrey Acland

Elections in the 1940s

Elections in the 1950s

Elections in the 1960s

Elections in the 1970s

References

 D. Brunton & D. H. Pennington, Members of the Long Parliament (London: George Allen & Unwin, 1954)
 Cobbett's Parliamentary history of England, from the Norman Conquest in 1066 to the year 1803 (London: Thomas Hansard, 1808) 
 F. W. S. Craig, British Parliamentary Election Results 1832–1885 (2nd edition, Aldershot: Parliamentary Research Services, 1989)
 F W S Craig, British Parliamentary Election Results 1918–1949 (Glasgow: Political Reference Publications, 1969)
 Maija Jansson (ed.), Proceedings in Parliament, 1614 (House of Commons) (Philadelphia: American Philosophical Society, 1988)
 Henry Stooks Smith, The Parliaments of England from 1715 to 1847 (2nd edition, edited by FWS Craig – Chichester: Parliamentary Reference Publications, 1973)
 

Parliamentary constituencies in North West England (historic)
Constituencies of the Parliament of the United Kingdom established in 1290
Constituencies of the Parliament of the United Kingdom disestablished in 1885
Constituencies of the Parliament of the United Kingdom established in 1918
Constituencies of the Parliament of the United Kingdom disestablished in 1983